Wheelchair Basketball at the 2004 Summer Paralympics was staged in the Olympic Indoor Hall from September 18 to September 28.

Medalists

Source: Paralympic.org

Classification
Classification is an important element that will ensure athletes can compete in a fair situation.

A certain committee will give athletes who can take part in this sport an eight-level-score specific to basketball, ranging from 1 to 4.5. Lower scores represent a larger disability. The sum score of all players on the court cannot exceed 14.

Teams

Men's

Women's

Competition format
Teams consisted of twelve players, of whom five were on court at any one time. Each player was rated between 0.5 and 4.5 points based on the extent of their disability, with 4.5 representing the least physical limitation. The sum of the rates of all players on court at any time was limited to 14.5 points per team.

Games were played in four periods of ten minutes, with extra time periods of five minutes added as necessary to resolve a tied game.

See also
Basketball at the 2004 Summer Olympics

References

 
Wheelchair basketball
2004
International basketball competitions hosted by Greece
2004 in basketball
2004–05 in Greek basketball